Qum may refer to:
Qom, Iran
Qom, Razavi Khorasan, a village in Razavi Khorasan Province, Iran
Qum, Azerbaijan